Diamonds is a 1999 American comedy film directed by John Mallory Asher and written by Allan Aaron Katz. The film stars Kirk Douglas, Dan Aykroyd, Lauren Bacall, Jenny McCarthy, and Corbin Allred.

Several clips from Douglas' 1949 film Champion are used to illustrate his character's career as a boxer.

Plot
An elderly man and his estranged son search for treasure and try to repair their relationship. Harry Agensky (Kirk Douglas) is a one-time welterweight boxing champion who lives in Canada with his son Moses (Kurt Fuller). Harry's other son, Lance (Dan Aykroyd), feels that his father never really cared about his dreams and ambitions, and now Lance has little affection for his Dad. However, Lance's relationship with his teenage son Michael (Corbin Allred) is not faring much better.

Lonely since the death of his wife and infirm due to a stroke, Harry wants to retire to a ranch in Northern Canada, but he can't afford the property. Lance invites Harry along for a skiing trip with Michael; Harry agrees, but at the last minute he talks them into going to Nevada instead. Harry claims he threw a fight years ago and was paid off in a cache of diamonds that he hid somewhere in Reno; if he can find the gems, he'll be able to buy the ranch. Lance is dubious, but he gives in to Harry's determination and the three head for Nevada, hoping to find the diamonds.

On the way there, the men visit a local brothel run by madame Sin-Dee (Lauren Bacall), when Harry convinces the group, so that he can have sex for the first time in eight years.18-year-old grandson Michael gets his Dad to let him join so that he can lose his virginity. Following their quest for the hidden diamonds, both father and son learn a lesson about reconciliation and the price of growing older.

Cast
Kirk Douglas as Harry Agensky
Dan Aykroyd as Lance Agensky
Corbin Allred as Michael Agensky
Lauren Bacall as Sin-Dee
Kurt Fuller as Moses Agensky
Jenny McCarthy as Sugar
Mariah O'Brien as Tiffany
June Chadwick as Roseanne Agensky
Lee Tergesen as Border Guard
Val Bisiglio as Tarzan
Allan Aaron Katz as Mugger
Roy Conrad as Pit Boss
John Landis as Gambler
Joyce Bulifant as June
Liz Gandara as Roxanne
James Russo as Damian (Uncredited)

References

External links

1999 films
1999 comedy films
Films scored by Joel Goldsmith
Films about old age
Films about virginity
Films set in Nevada
Films shot in Nevada
Films shot at Pinewood Studios
1990s English-language films